Belle Vue Halt (For Port-E-Vullen), also known as Bellevue (Manx: Stadd Reayrt Aalin), is an intermediate stopping place on the northern section of the Manx Electric Railway on the Isle of Man.

Location
It is situated between Lewaigue Station and Ramsey, the line's northern terminus. The poles bearing the overhead lines on the M.E.R. are numbered from Douglas and Belle Vue can be found at pole 846. The halt is located on the A15 road to Maughold Village and is actually closer to Port Lewaigue than to Port-E-Vullen.

Shelter
Until 2001, there was a corrugated iron lineside shelter at the stop. Following some local controversy over its demolition, it was eventually replaced by a wooden structure originally located at Port Jack, north of Douglas.

Upkeep
The station is tended to by a group of locals who annually decorate the shelter and surroundings with flower beds and hanging baskets as well as attending to the general cleanliness of the area.

Route

Also
Manx Electric Railway Stations

References

Sources

 Manx Electric Railway Stopping Places (2002) Manx Electric Railway Society
 Island Island Images: Manx Electric Railway Pages (2003) Jon Wornham
 Official Official Tourist Department Page (2009) Isle Of Man Heritage Railways

Manx Electric Railway
Railway stations in the Isle of Man
Railway stations opened in 1899
1899 establishments in the Isle of Man